Events in the year 2000 in Uganda.

Incumbents
President: Yoweri Museveni
Vice President: Specioza Kazibwe
Prime Minister: Apolo Nsibambi

Events
 29 June – 2000 Ugandan multi-party referendum is held.
 Uganda National Academy of Sciences is established

Births

 12 March – Stephani Nampiina, cricketer

References

 
2000s in Uganda
Years of the 21st century in Uganda
Uganda 
Uganda